Mangouin is a village in western Ivory Coast. It is in the sub-prefecture of Biankouma, Biankouma Department, Tonkpi Region, Montagnes District.

Until 2012, Mangouin was in the commune of Mangouin-Yrongouin. In March 2012, Mangouin-Yrongouin became one of 1126 communes nationwide that were abolished. Yrongouin is a smaller village one-and-a-half kilometres north of Mangouin.

Notes

Populated places in Montagnes District
Populated places in Tonkpi